(Alexander Severus, HWV A13) is an opera by George Frideric Handel composed in 1738. It is one of Handel's three pasticcio works, made up of the music and arias of his previous operas Giustino, Berenice and Arminio. Only the overture and recitatives (as well as the words) were new. The impresario Johann Jacob Heidegger probably selected the 1717 libretto by Apostolo Zeno, originally written for Antonio Lotti and re-used by many composers thereafter.

Performance history
Alessandro Severo was not a success at its premiere under the direction of the composer on 25 February 1738 at the King's Theatre, London.

Roles

Synopsis
The opera is based upon the story of the Roman Emperor Alexander Severus.

References
Notes

Sources
 
  The second of the two volume definitive reference on the operas of Handel

Operas by George Frideric Handel
1738 operas
Italian-language operas
Operas